John Francis "Red" Flaherty (April 25, 1917 – April 1, 1999) was a professional baseball umpire who worked in the American League from 1953 to 1973. Flaherty umpired 3,208 major league games in his 21-year career. He umpired in four World Series (1955, 1958, 1965, and 1970), two League Championship Series (1969 and 1972) and three All-Star Games (1956, 1961 and 1969).

In 1936, Flaherty played for Falmouth in the Cape Cod Baseball League.

Death
Flaherty died on April 1, 1999, at his home in Falmouth, MA. His death resulted from stroke-related complications.

References

External links
The Sporting News umpire card

1917 births
1999 deaths
Baseball people from Massachusetts
Cape Cod Baseball League players (pre-modern era)
Falmouth Commodores players
Major League Baseball umpires
People from Maynard, Massachusetts
People from Falmouth, Massachusetts
Sportspeople from Barnstable County, Massachusetts
Sportspeople from Middlesex County, Massachusetts